The Arabic-language journal Al-Balagh al-Usbuʿi (Arabic: البلاغ الاسبوعی; DMG: al-Balāġ al-Usbūʿī; English: "The Weekly News") was published weekly in Cairo, Egypt, between 1926 and 1930. It was the weekly edition of the newspaper Al Balagh. The first issue of the journal appeared in November 1926.

Four volumes with a total of 150 editions were published. Abbas Mahmoud al-Aqqad (1889-1964), the founder, was a well-known Egyptian writer, poet, philosopher and historian who appointed Abdul Qadir Hamzah as editor of the journal. In addition to critical political articles, numerous poems and prose were published in the magazine. Among well-known authors Mohammed Abd al-Mu'ti al-Hamshari (1908-1938) gained popularity through his poetry. Nabawiyya Mousa Badawia (1886-1951), a teacher and pioneer among Egyptian women's rights activists of the 20th century, designed a special page for women with feminist themes and discourses of Egypt from that time.

Al-Balagh al-Usbuʿi was also regarded as a supporter of the Wafd Party, therefore its publication was probably discontinued in 1930.

References

External links

1926 establishments in Egypt
1930 disestablishments in Egypt
Arabic-language magazines
Defunct literary magazines published in Egypt
Defunct political magazines published in Egypt
Magazines established in 1926
Magazines disestablished in 1930
Magazines published in Cairo
Weekly magazines published in Egypt